Los Espookys is an American comedy television series created by Julio Torres, Ana Fabrega, and Fred Armisen, who also star alongside Bernardo Velasco and Cassandra Ciangherotti. The series follows a group of friends trying to turn their love of horror into a successful business, where most of their jobs consist of fabricating horror film-like situations and tricking people into thinking they are real. Los Espookys premiered on June 14, 2019 on HBO. In July 2019, the series was renewed for a second season which premiered on September 16, 2022. In December 2022, the series was canceled after two seasons.

Los Espookys "follows a group of friends who turn their love for horror into a peculiar business, providing horror to those who need it, in a dreamy Latin American country where the strange and eerie are just part of daily life."

Cast and characters

Main 
 Bernardo Velasco as Renaldo, a horror and gore enthusiast who assembles his friends to form Los Espookys. He is kind and optimistic, but naïve and incompetent with finances. He also appears to be asexual.
 Julio Torres as Andrés Valdez, Renaldo's best friend since childhood and member of Los Espookys, and the adopted heir to a chocolate empire. While trying to put up with his unapproachable parents and the future husband they chose for him, he is also haunted by a mysterious demon, and longs to unlock the secrets of his past.
 Cassandra Ciangherotti as Úrsula, a friend of Renaldo and sister to Tati, and a member of Los Espookys. She is smart, resourceful and more down-to-earth than the other members, but struggles with her job as a dental hygienist due to the mean behavior of her boss.
 Ana Fabrega as Tati, Úrsula's dimwitted sister and a member of Los Espookys. She is constantly switching between strange jobs to try to make a living and is willing to put herself into any situation the other Espookys need her in. She has a boyfriend whom she has only met online, but later marries Andrés's gay ex-boyfriend, oblivious to the fact it is not a love marriage.
 Fred Armisen as Tico, Renaldo's uncle and a trusted and dedicated employee of a valet parking company. He is very supportive of Renaldo's efforts and happy with his job, but struggles with his daughter's attitude problems and his own tendency to be too selfless. During the second season, Tico and his daughter move in with Renaldo after valet parking becomes obsolete due to self-parking cars, and he struggles to find a new direction, briefly joining Los Espookys.

Recurring 
 José Pablo Minor as Juan Carlos, Andrés' vain boyfriend, who later becomes Tati's husband in a lavender marriage. He comes from a wealthy family that runs a successful cookie empire.
 Spike Einbinder as the Water Spirit, a mystical aquatic entity linked to Andrés' soul and lives inside of him. In season 2, she "quits" and enters the real world, getting a job as an assistant to Melanie Gibbons.
 River L. Ramirez as Sonia, Tico's bratty, mean-spirited, dependent daughter.
 Greta Titelman as US Ambassador Melanie Gibbons, who meets Los Espookys during one of their jobs, and later hires them for another. In season 2, a key subplot involves her trying to become US ambassador in Miami, unaware that it is part of the United States.
 Carmen Gloria Bresky as Mayor Teresa Lobos, a client of Los Espookys in season 1 who starts a presidential campaign in the second season.
 Adela Calderón as Renaldo's mother, who is constantly trying to find him a girlfriend.
 Giannina Fruttero as Beatriz, Renaldo's sister
 Carol Kane as Bianca Nova (season 1), an aging and forgotten American film director who befriends Tico.
 Martine Gutierrez as Karina Salgado (season 2), a beauty queen who was Miss Puerto Rico, and brutally died immediately after being crowned Nuestra Belleza Latina; in the second season, her ghost starts haunting Renaldo.
 Yalitza Aparicio as The Moon (season 2), whom Andrés can talk to
 Andrea Villalobos as Mónica Martinez (season 2), a cousin of Renaldo who starts working for Los Espookys after loosing her previous job
 Sebastián Ayala as Oliver Twix (season 2), a neglectful mortician
 Kim Petras as the Secretary of State (season 2)
 Isabella Rossellini as herself (season 2)

Episodes

Season 1 (2019)

Season 2 (2022)

Production

Development
On November 21, 2017, it was announced that HBO had given the production, then titled Mexico City: Only Good Things Happen, a pilot order. The episode was written by Fred Armisen, Ana Fabrega, and Julio Torres and set to be directed by Fernando Frias. The production staff of the potential series was set to include Armisen, Lorne Michaels, Andrew Singer as executive producers and Torres and Alice Mathias as co-executive producers. Production companies involved with the series are expected to include Broadway Video and Más Mejor.

On July 2, 2018, it was announced that HBO had given the production, now titled Los Espookys, a series order for a first season. It was additionally announced that Fabrega would serve as a co-executive producer and that Antigravico would join the list of production companies involved with the series.

On April 16, 2019, it was announced that the series would premiere on June 14, 2019. On July 24, 2019, HBO renewed the series for a second season which premiered on September 16, 2022. Filming for the second season wrapped in February 2022. On December 2, 2022, HBO canceled the series after two seasons.

Casting
Alongside the pilot order announcement, it was confirmed that the pilot would star Bernardo Velasco, Cassandra Ciangherotti, Ana Fabrega as Tati, Julio Torres, and Fred Armisen.

Reception
The review aggregator website Rotten Tomatoes reports a 100% approval rating with an average score of 8.71/10, based on 26 reviews. The website's critical consensus reads, "Igualmente hilarante y horripilante, Los Espookys is an espooky good time." Metacritic, which uses a weighted average, gave the series a score of 82 out of 100, based on reviews from 12 critics, indicating "universal acclaim."

References

External links
 

2010s American comedy television series
2020s American comedy television series
2019 American television series debuts
2022 American television series endings
Spanish-language HBO original programming
Television series by Broadway Video
Television series by Home Box Office
Television series set in 2019
Television shows set in South America
Television shows filmed in Chile
Spanish-language television programming in the United States
Magic realism television series